Doxy may refer to

 An archaic English term for prostitute
 Doxy (song), a jazz standard by Sonny Rollins
 Doxy, a magical creature in the fictional Harry Potter universe
 Doxycycline, an antibiotic drug
 Doxylamine, an antihistamine drug
 An abbreviation for Doxygen, a software package
 Doxy (vibrator), a British-made wand vibrator

See also
 Doxey, a village and civil parish in Staffordshire, England